John Wood, FRCS, FRS (12 October 1825 – 29 December 1891) was a British surgeon at King's College Hospital. He was an expert on hernias, and an early investigator of the antiseptic practices pioneered by Joseph Lister, the topic of his 1885 Bradshaw Lecture.

References

1825 births
1891 deaths
British surgeons
Fellows of the Royal College of Surgeons
Fellows of the Royal Society
Burials at Kensal Green Cemetery